The Straight Way is a 1916 American silent drama film written and directed by Will S. Davis. The film starred Valeska Suratt and was distributed by the Fox Film Corporation. The Straight Way is now considered lost.

Cast
Valeska Suratt as Mary Madison
Herbert Heyes as John Madison
Glen White as Dan Walters
Claire Whitney as Nell Madison
Elsie Balfour as Marion Madison
Richard Turner as Sullivan
Richard Rendell as Carey
Fred Jones as Burton
T. Tamamoto as Valet

See also
1937 Fox vault fire

References

External links

1916 films
1916 drama films
Fox Film films
Silent American drama films
American silent feature films
American black-and-white films
Films directed by Will S. Davis
Lost American films
1916 lost films
Lost drama films
1910s American films
1910s English-language films